As-Suwayda ( / ALA-LC romanization: as-Suwaydāʾ), also spelled Sweida or Swaida, is a mainly Druze city located in southwestern Syria, close to the border with Jordan.

It is the capital of As-Suwayda Governorate, one of Syria's 14 governorates, bordering Jordan in the South and Daraa Governorate in the West and Rif Dimashq Governorate in the north and east. The city is referred to by some as "Little Venezuela" due to the city's influx of affluent Venezuelan Syrian immigrants.

Demographics and population

The inhabitants of the city are mainly Druze with a prominent Greek Orthodox Christians and Sunni Muslim minority.

The population of As-Suwayda Governorate is 313,231 (2004 census).

History

Ancient and Medieval eras

The city was founded by the Nabataeans as Suada. It became known as Dionysias Soada in the Hellenistic period and the Roman Empire, for the god Dionysus, patron of wine - the city is situated in a famous ancient wine-producing region.

The name Dionysias replaced the former Nabataean name in 149 AD after Nabataean influence decreased and then concentrated towards the south, as a result of the then accelerating Hellenization of Coele-Syria.

Dionysias was a part of the Roman province of Arabia Petraea, and received the rights of civitas during the reign of Commodus between 180–185.

Dionysus was worshipped in the same Nabatean temple dedicated to Dushara. This practice of associating the worship of local and Hellenic gods was common in Hellenistic Syria.

This name remained in use during the Byzantine Empire, when the town was under the influence of the Ghassanids. Dionysias then was a diocese with a suffragan bishop from Bosra. It was mentioned in the Synecdemus of Hierocles. After the early Muslim conquests, the city was conquered by the Rashidun Caliphate of the Arabs in 629 and became a titular see.

Yaqut al-Hamawi noted in the 1220s that As Suwaida  was "a village of the Hauran Province".

Ottoman era 
In 1516, the city and the adjoining region was conquered from the Mamluk Sultanate by the Ottoman Empire. In 1596 As-Suwayda appeared under the name of Majdal Sawda in the Ottoman tax registers as part of the nahiya (subdistrict) of Bani Nasiyya of the Hauran Sanjak. It had a population of 5 households and 5 bachelors, all Muslim. The villagers paid a fixed tax rate of 20%  on various agricultural products, including wheat, barley, summer crops, goats and/or beehives, in addition to "occasional revenues"; a total of 6,125 akçe. 3/4 of the revenue went to a waqf.

In recent times Dionysias was firstly identified as as-Suwayda by William Waddington.

Modern era
The city has been held by the government for the duration of the Syrian Civil War and has seen relatively little fighting. On 28 October 2012, security forces launched a campaign of mass arrests in the city.

2018 As-Suwayda attacks 

On July 25, 2018, the city, which had been by that time far away from the front lines, was rocked by a string of terrorist attacks. A group of at least 56 ISIS-affiliated attackers entered the city and initiated a series of gunfights and suicide bombings on its streets killing at least 246 people, the vast majority of them civilians. Many of the terrorists were reported killed during the attack, bringing the total death toll to at least 302 people. Forty-two Druze between the ages of 7 to 60 were kidnapped by ISIS and are being held captive. One has been executed bringing the total in captivity to 41.

2020 Suweida protests
On 7 June 2020, anti-government protests erupted in the city due to the deteriorating economic situation. Protesters demanded the resignation of President Bashar al-Assad for the first time since 2015 in the city which had remained neutral during the Syrian civil war. As a result of the protests, Prime Minister Imad Khamis was sacked on 11 June and replaced by Hussein Arnous.

2022 Suweida protests 
In February, hundreds of protesters took to the streets in Sweida to decry corruption and worsening living standards.

Archaeology

Many archeological sites could be found in the old part of the city:
Temple of Dionysus-Dushara: eight well-decorated columns are still standing from the temple.
Saint Sergius Basilica: was built in the fifth century. It has Byzantine architectural elements, with an abbey surrounding it. The basilica was dedicated to Sergius.
The arch of the lesser church: the church itself is ruined. An arch is still standing there known locally as "The Gallows" ( al-Mashnaqah) with grape motif decorations.
The theater: was recently discovered, south of the Agora.

The city has many ancient reservoirs, towers and old Roman houses that are still inhabited by locals.

Many parts of the old city are still to be excavated, such as the Roman aqueduct, a conical reservoir, and a larger Roman theatre. There is also an old 7th century mosque built during the time of the Rashidun Caliphate.

Climate
As Suwayda's climate is classified as warm and temperate. There is more rainfall in the winter than in the summer in As Suwayda. This location is classified as Csa by Köppen and Geiger. The average temperature in As Suwayda is 15.5 °C. About 323 mm of precipitation falls annually.

Notable people
 Najat Abdul Samad, writer, translator, and obstetrician.

References

Bibliography

External links
 Map of the town, Google Maps

Cities in Syria
Populated places in as-Suwayda District
Archaeological sites in as-Suwayda Governorate
Roman sites in Syria
Druze communities in Syria
Eastern Orthodox Christian communities in Syria